The Wabbit Who Came to Supper is a 1942 Merrie Melodies cartoon featuring Bugs Bunny and Elmer Fudd. It was released on March 28, 1942, and directed by Friz Freleng.

Plot
Elmer's hunting dogs have Bugs cornered when Elmer receives a telegram that says that his uncle Louie promises him $3 million in his will, but only if he doesn't harm any animals, especially rabbits. Elmer sets Bugs free and heads home. When Elmer arrives home, he hears Bugs singing in the shower and tries to kill him, but Bugs pokes out a sign that reminds Elmer of Uncle Louie. Elmer tries to get Bugs to leave the house and eventually tricks him into going out.

Bugs then pretends to die of "p-neumonia", causing Elmer to take him back in, fearing that he may have lost his chance to receive the money. Elmer is rocking Bugs and singing him a lullaby when a letter comes which says that Uncle Louie has died, and Elmer now inherits $3 million. However, inheritance taxes, several other taxes, and legal fees have depleted the entire inheritance, leaving Elmer owing Uncle Louie's attorney $1.98. Enraged at having put up with Bugs’ shenanigans for nothing, Elmer chases Bugs around the house and Bugs eventually runs out. A few seconds later, a postman arrives and gives Elmer a giant Easter egg, which pops open and reveals many tiny Bugs Bunnys who jump out and run around the house.

Production
This short is one of several pre-August 1948 WB cartoon shorts that lapsed into the public domain due to United Artists failing to renew the copyright in time.

The title of the short is a reference to the 1942 Warner Brothers film version of the 1939 George S. Kaufman Broadway comedy The Man Who Came to Dinner, in which an overbearing house-guest threatens to take over the lives of a small-town family.

Home media
Being in the public domain, The Wabbit Who Came to Supper was featured on several low-budget VHS releases of public domain cartoons. (The use of "Angel in Disguise," which remains under copyright, has complicated the short's public domain status.)

On the 2005 Looney Tunes Golden Collection: Volume 3 DVD release, The Wabbit Who Came to Supper is presented in a restored unedited version with a commentary track provided by animation historian Jerry Beck and Warner Brothers' inker Martha Sigall, one of about 40 uncredited inkers and painters who labored on the Looney Tunes shorts.

See also
List of films in the public domain in the United States

References

External links

 
 The Wabbit Who Came To Supper on the Internet Archive

1940s English-language films
1942 short films
1942 comedy films
1942 animated films
1940s animated short films
1940s Warner Bros. animated short films
Merrie Melodies short films
Bugs Bunny films
Elmer Fudd films
Short films directed by Friz Freleng
Films produced by Leon Schlesinger
Films scored by Carl Stalling
Films with screenplays by Michael Maltese
Films about inheritances
American animated short films
Animated films about rabbits and hares